The String Octet in E-flat major, Op. 20, was written by the 16-year-old Felix Mendelssohn during the fall of 1825 and completed on October 15. Written for four violins, two violas, and two cellos, this work created a new chamber music genre. Conrad Wilson summarizes much of its reception ever since: "Its youthful verve, brilliance and perfection make it one of the miracles of nineteenth-century music." This was one of the first works of Mendelssohn to be very well-received.

Background 
Mendelssohn wrote his octet and gave a signed score to his friend and violin teacher  as a birthday present. Rietz copied parts from the score to use for the premiere. The string octet was a fairly new genre of chamber music at the time, the most widely known genre of chamber music still being the string quartet. The genre was rapidly gaining popularity among other composers.

When Mendelssohn composed his octet, it was a rather new genre, and he may have been inspired by Louis Spohr's Double Quartet in D minor, Op. 65. But Spohr's double quartet was written with the two quartets playing apart from each other; Mendelssohn's octet is an undivided ensemble. In the score, Mendelssohn wrote that the piece should "be played by all the instruments in the style of a symphony."

Structure

The work comprises four movements:

A typical performance of the work lasts around 30 minutes, with the first movement usually comprising roughly half of this.

The scherzo, later scored for orchestra as a replacement for the minuet in the composer's First Symphony at its premiere, is believed to have been inspired by the section of Goethe's Faust titled "Walpurgis Night's Dream". Fragments of this movement recur in the finale, as a precursor to the "cyclic" technique employed by later 19th-century composers. The entire work is also notable for its extended use of counterpoint, with the finale, in particular, beginning with an eight-part fugato. In this section, Mendelssohn quotes the melody of "And he shall reign forever and ever" from the "Hallelujah Chorus" of Handel's Messiah.

Instrumentation
The original score is for a double string quartet with four violins and pairs of violas and cellos. Mendelssohn instructed in the public score, "This Octet must be played by all the instruments in symphonic orchestral style. Pianos and fortes must be strictly observed and more strongly emphasized than is usual in pieces of this character."

The piece is sometimes played by full string sections using more players for each part as well as an added double bass part which usually (but not always) doubles the second cello part an octave lower. Arturo Toscanini created such a version for a performance with the NBC Symphony Orchestra in 1947. In 2009, conductor Yoon Jae Lee made a transcription of the first, second, and last movements for full orchestra.

The composer also transcribed the piece as a piano duet with violin and cello ad. lib. and orchestrated the third movement (with alterations) as an alternative third movement to his Symphony No. 1 in C minor.

References

External links
 
 Complete performance of the Octet by the Musicians from Marlboro from the Isabella Stewart Gardner Museum  in MP3 format.  (32:22)
 Another complete performance of the Octet by the Prazak & Zemlinsky Quartets at the Festival Wissembourg - September 4, 2013 (35:36)

Chamber music by Felix Mendelssohn
1825 compositions
Compositions for octet
Compositions in E-flat major
Music dedicated to family or friends
Music dedicated to students or teachers